The Birth of a Nation may refer to:

 The Birth of a Nation, a 1915 silent film directed by D.W. Griffith (originally titled The Clansman)
 Birth of a Nation (1983 film), a television movie about the British educational system directed by Mike Newell
 The Birth of a Nation (2016 film), a film about Nat Turner directed by Nate Parker
 The Birth of a Nation: The Inspired By Album, the companion album to the 2016 movie The Birth of a Nation